The Necronomicon is a fictional grimoire from the stories of horror writer H. P. Lovecraft.

Necronomicon may also refer to:

Books and publishing
 Necronomicon Press, American small-press publishing house, founded in 1976
 Published works:
 Simon Necronomicon, 1977 grimoire, and best-known such work avoiding conventions of modern fictional narratives 
 Necronomicon (H. R. Giger), 1977 compendium of images by that Swiss artist
 Necronomicon: The Best Weird Tales of H. P. Lovecraft: Commemorative Edition, a 2008 anthology published by Gollancz
 Necronimicon, alternative title of Flemish comic book series de Rode Ridder

Films and television 
 Necronomicon (film), a 1993 American horror anthology film
 Necronomicon - Geträumte Sünden, the German-language title of the 1967 film Succubus by Jesús Franco
 Necronomicon Ex-Mortis, a version of Lovecraft's Necronomicon in the Evil Dead movie series
 Mystery of the Necronomicon, a 2001 hentai anime created by Abogato Powers

Gaming
 Necronomicon: The Dawning of Darkness, a 2001 video game for the PC by Wanadoo Edition

Music
 Necronomicon (Nox Arcana album), 2004
 Necronomicon (The Devil'z Rejects album), 2006
 Necronomicon (band) German thrash metal band.

Events
 NecronomiCon Providence, a biannual Lovecraft convention held in Providence, Rhode Island

See also
Scotichronicon